Sveti Ivan Žabno is a municipality in the Koprivnica-Križevci County in Croatia. According to the 2011 census, there are 5,222 inhabitants in the area.

Settlements
The municipality consists of the following settlements:
 Brdo Cirkvensko, population 156
 Brezovljani, population 305
 Cepidlak, population 155
 Cirkvena, population 574
 Hrsovo, population 268
 Kenđelovec, population 164
 Kuštani, population 116
 Ladinec, population 152
 Markovac Križevački, population 147
 Novi Glog, population 144
 Predavec Križevački, population 111
 Rašćani, population 130
 Sveti Ivan Žabno, population 1,199
 Sveti Petar Čvrstec, population 603
 Škrinjari, population 212
 Trema, population 786

History
In the late 19th century and early 20th century, Sveti Ivan Žabno was part of the Bjelovar-Križevci County of the Kingdom of Croatia-Slavonia, Austria-Hungary.

References

Municipalities of Croatia
Populated places in Koprivnica-Križevci County